The Samsung Galaxy A8s is a midrange Android smartphone produced by Samsung Electronics as part of the Samsung Galaxy A series. It was announced on 10 December 2018 primarily for the Chinese market. It is also sold as the Samsung Galaxy A9 Pro (2019) in South Korea.

The A8s is a triple camera smartphone produced by Samsung, featuring 3 different cameras on the rear. It features a 6.4 inch IPS LCD FHD+ Infinity-O Display without a notch. A circular hole is punched out in the top left corner of the display for the front camera, branded as the Infinity-O Display. It is also the first Samsung smartphone to not include a headphone jack.

Specifications

The A8s features a 6.4 inch Full HD+ IPS LCD display with a 19.5:9 aspect ratio. Unlike previous Samsung A series phones, this device uses a normal LCD panel rather than an AMOLED display. The new Infinity-O display features a full edge to edge display with a 6.7mm round hole punched out in the top left corner for the front camera.

The triple camera setup features a primary 24MP f/1.7 sensor for normal photography, a 10MP f/2.4 telephoto sensor with optical zoom and a 5MP depth sensor for effects such as bokeh. The front camera is a 24MP f/2.0 sensor in a pin-hole punched out in the display.

It runs Android 8.0 "Oreo" with Samsung Experience 9.0 respectively out-of-the box, however it is upgradable to Android 9.0 "Pie". The smartphone features an upgraded Qualcomm Snapdragon 710 SoC consisting of 2 performance 2.2GHz kyro 460 and 6 efficient 1.7GHz kyro 360 backed by a new Adreno 616 GPU and sports 6 GB/8 GB of RAM and 128 GB of internal storage, expandable to 512 GB via a MicroSD card slot, through a dedicated SD card slot.

Availability
Following the unveiling, Samsung announced that the device will go on sale in only in the Chinese market, with no announcement to release in other countries. However, on January 25, 2019, the phone was announced in South Korea as the Galaxy A9 Pro.

References

Android (operating system) devices
Samsung Galaxy
Samsung smartphones
Mobile phones introduced in 2018
Mobile phones with multiple rear cameras
Discontinued smartphones